John Kidd is the name of:

John Kidd (American football) (born 1961), punter for five teams
John Kidd (chemist) (1775–1851), English physician, chemist and geologist
John Kidd (footballer) (born 1936), footballer for Tranmere Rovers
John Kidd (Paralympian) (1947–2016), Australian Paralympic athletics and wheelchair basketball competitor
John Kidd (politician) (1838–1919), Australian politician
John Kidd (actor) (1907–1995), British actor in When the Boat Comes In
John G. Kidd (1908–1991), American physician, pathologist, and virologist

See also
John Kid
Johnny Kidd (disambiguation)
Jack Kidd (disambiguation)